Mount Young (formerly Mount Cerberus), is an Alaskan volcano on Semisopochnoi Island named after former U.S. Congressman Don Young. A bill was signed into law by U.S. President Joe Biden in December 2022 to rename the volcano and commemorate the legacy of Young.

References

Mountains of Alaska
Volcanoes of Alaska
Volcanoes of the Aleutian Islands